Footscray RUFC is a rugby union club based in New Eltham, South East London. The club has three men's teams, a women's team and a mini rugby section. 

The club was formed in 1967 by workers at the Kolster-Brandes (later ITT, and then STC) Factory in Foots Cray, Kent. In the early 90s, STC closed the Foots Cray site and the side became homeless, playing home games at a local school for a period. The club moved to New Eltham in 1995.

The club hosts the annual Footscray 7s tournament on the first Saturday in May. The rugby sevens tournament attracts high quality entrants from across the country.

See also 
Kent RFU
Middlesex RFU

References

English rugby union teams
Rugby union in Kent
1967 establishments in England
Rugby clubs established in 1967